Daeng Soetigna (May 13, 1908 – April 8, 1984) was a famous music teacher who is considered the father of modern  music. He redesigned the ancient Indonesian instrument, enabling it to play international music. He was also active in staging  orchestras in various regions in Indonesia.

Tribute
On May 13, 2016, Google celebrated his 108th birthday with a Google Doodle.

References 

1908 births
1984 deaths
Sundanese people